Micrarionta is a genus of medium-sized air-breathing land snails, terrestrial pulmonate gastropod mollusks in the family Helminthoglyptidae.

Species
The following species are recognised in the genus Micrarionta:
Micrarionta beatula 
Micrarionta facta  - concentrated snail
Micrarionta feralis  - fraternal snail
Micrarionta gabbii  - Gabb's snail
Micrarionta guadalupiana 
Micrarionta intermedia 
Micrarionta micromphala 
Micrarionta opuntia  - prickly pear island snail
Micrarionta rufocincta 
Micrarionta sodalis 
Micrarionta veatchii

References

 
Helminthoglyptidae
Taxa named by César Marie Félix Ancey
Taxonomy articles created by Polbot